Chris Cattaneo is a retired American soccer forward who played professionally in the North American Soccer League and the Major Indoor Soccer League.

Cattaneo graduated from John F. Kennedy High School.  Cattaneo attended Tennessee Wesleyan College where he was a 1977 NAIA Second Team All American soccer player.  In 1979, he turned professional with the Atlanta Chiefs of the North American Soccer League.  In 1980, he moved to the Denver Avalanche of the Major Indoor Soccer League.

He is currently a volunteer assistant coach for the Drexel Dragons women's team.  Cattaneo previously coached for the Delaware Blue Hens women's team.

References

External links
 NASL/MISL stats

1957 births
American soccer players
Atlanta Chiefs players
Denver Avalanche players
Living people
Major Indoor Soccer League (1978–1992) players
North American Soccer League (1968–1984) players
Tennessee Wesleyan Bulldogs men's soccer players
Association football forwards